The 2016 CS Nebelhorn Trophy was a senior international figure skating competition held in September 2016 at the Eissportzentrum Oberstdorf. It was part of the 2016–17 ISU Challenger Series. Medals were awarded in the disciplines of men's singles, ladies' singles, pair skating, and ice dance.

Entries

Withdrew before starting orders drawn
 Men: Alexander Majorov (SWE), Nicola Todeschini (SUI), Alexander Bjelde (GER), Anton Kempf (GER)
 Ladies: Jenni Saarinen (FIN), Michaela-Lucie Hanzliková (CZE), Jelizaveta Leonova (EST), Simona Gospodinova (BUL), Angela Wang (USA)
 Pairs: Tarah Kayne / Daniel O'Shea (USA)
 Ice dance: Lilah Fear / Lewis Gibson (GBR), Elena Ilinykh / Ruslan Zhiganshin (RUS)

Added
 Ladies: Karoliina Luhtonen (FIN), Brooklee Han (AUS)
 Pairs: Ashley Cain / Timothy Leduc (USA)

Results

Men

Ladies

Pairs

Ice dance

References

External links
 2016 Nebelhorn Trophy at the International Skating Union
 2016 Nebelhorn Trophy at the Deutsche Eislauf-Union

CS Nebelhorn Trophy
Nebelhorn Trophy